Nick Faure (born 28 May 1944) is a former English Sportscar racing driver, and purveyor of Porsche in the United Kingdom of his era. Known affectionately as Mr. Porsche, Faure achieved fame through racing and selling Porsche 911 and 356s, since the 1960s and his name has become synonymous with the marque. His fame allowed him the opportunity at Le Mans 24 Hours eleven times. He retired from international motor sport after his last race, 1989 Spa 24 Hours.

Career

In 1967 and 1968, he raced the ex-works 911, that Vic Elford had raced for Porsche GB. In 1969, Faure moved into British Saloon Car Championship, with the support of Porsche Cars GB, racing for the Demetriou Group. During the season, he achieved three fourth place finishes at Silverstone, Snetterton and Crystal Palace. This resulted in 16th place in the overall championship standings (4th in class) For the next three seasons, Faure had step away from the International scene and raced nationally. In 1973, he was invited by Porsche to drive their brand new Carrera RS 2.7 lightweight in the British Production Sports Car Championship. He then moved on to the RS 3.0 version for the following season, still under Porsche Cars GB banner.

1974 also saw Faure receive an invitation to drive a Carrera 3.0 RSR for Ecurie Francorchamps, in the British Airways 1000km, at Brands Hatch. Although, due to gearbox problems, the car did not finish the race, this led to him to this first appearance in the Le Mans 24 hours. He helped steer the Carrera 3.0 RSR of ”Beurlys” to 6th overall, in his attempt in 1975. This would remain Faure’s best result, as he would never again finish inside the top 10. The 1977 Rivet Supply 6 Hours race at Brands Hatch, would see Faure’s best result in a World Sportscar race, when partnered by Bob Wollek, he finished fourth overall in a Porsche Kremer Racing 935.

He would continue to race annually at Le Mans until 1985, taking in some other Word Sportscar race, mainly in England without much success. After finishing 36th in the 1989 24 Heures de Francorchamps - Lotto Trophy, he would retire from International Motor Sport.

Away from the track

Since his association with the Stuttgart marque has been famous from his experience, driving so many types of competition Porsches. Since the mid-1980s, Faure has run his own Porsche Specialist outlet in Surrey, England, selling all thing 911 and 356 related. Faure’s reputation for driving 911s to their limit and sometimes beyond is legendary, in particular his “hands-off” technique of controlling opposite-lock cornering, allowing the car to show off its own self-centering abilities. His wealth of experience and enjoyment owning a 911, he can now supply some of the finest hand-picked examples of these classics.

Racing record

Career highlights

Complete 24 Hours of Le Mans results

Complete 24 Hours of Spa results

References

1944 births
British Touring Car Championship drivers
World Sportscar Championship drivers
24 Hours of Le Mans drivers
24 Hours of Spa drivers
Living people
Porsche Motorsports drivers